Dreamspaces is a BBC documentary TV series about architecture and interior design. The programme ran for two series and had twelve episodes total. The show was broadcast on BBC Three from 2003 to 2004.

The presenters of Dreamspaces were David Adjaye, Justine Frischmann and Charlie Luxton.

Episodes

Series 1 (2003)

Series 2 (2004)

About the Presenters

David Adjaye
David Adjaye is a graduate of the Royal College of Art. Having started a small practice in 1994, he soon built a reputation in reconstructing cafes, bars and private homes for high-profile clients, including Chris Ofili, Ewan McGregor and Alexander McQueen. His practice Adjaye/Associates has designed two 'Idea Store' libraries in the London Borough of Tower Hamlets, and the Bernie Grant Centre in Tottenham, along with a range of other commissions.

Justine Frischmann
Justine Frischmann received her BSc in architecture from the Bartlett in 1990. She then went on to lead the band Elastica. She was once one of the judges for the Royal Institute of British Architecture's Stirling Prize.

Charlie Luxton
Charlie Luxton has lived in England since 1983 and has an MA in architecture from Oxford Brookes University. He was the creative director of Make Communications, a company producing architecture, events and television. In November 2003 Make opened a new "urban experience" on London's South Bank involving giant wind turbines. In 2004 he presented a series Guerilla Homes.  As well as presenting on BBC Three, Charlie has been seen on BBC Four, Channel 4 and Five.

References
BBC Digital Television Foreword and Overview

Dreamspaces: The ‘Top Gear’ of Architecture online review

2003 British television series debuts
2004 British television series endings
2000s British documentary television series
BBC television documentaries
Documentary television series about art
English-language television shows